The Tajuasohn language, also known as Tajuason, Tajuoso, and Tajuosohn, is a Kru language of the Niger–Congo language family. It is spoken primarily in Sinoe County in eastern Liberia by members of five local clans.

In 1991, Tajuasohn was spoken by 9,600 people.

See also 
 Languages of Africa

References 

Kru languages
Languages of Liberia